The European Coil Coating Association (ECCA) is an international non-profit association dedicated to the diffusion of the use of coil and/or sheet coated metal.

Objectives 
The objectives of the European Coil Coating Association are described in the association's statutes and rules of procedure:

 Setting quality performance standards and developing test methods
 Spreading the benefits of coil and/or sheet coated metal with particular emphasis on environmental, cost and quality benefits
 Stimulating product, process, application and market developments
 Increasing the awareness of coil and/or sheet-coated metal through professional marketing and by organising educational training programmes for non-users
 Creating an industry network and forum for the development and exchange of ideas
 Representation of the Industry in its contacts with Public Officials and Public Authorities
 Providing liaison with other Trade Associations and Professional Bodies.

Activities 
To achieve these objectives, the Association will make use, amongst others, of the following activities:

 Organisation of scientific and technical seminars and of international meetings between members and with other actors within the sector
 Production of statistical, scientific and legal studies for the benefit of its members
 Publication of information for the benefit of the public and the users of the products
 Liaising with the European and national institutions.

Membership 
The Membership comprises almost 140 member companies in Europe as well as from the rest of the world. Members are:
 Coil coaters companies
 Paint, film and pre-treatment chemical suppliers
 Service centres/Stockholders
 Raw material suppliers
 Equipment manufacturers
 Technology providers
 Related associations/institutes
Member companies are e.g. Euramax Coated Products, ArcelorMittal, Tata Steel, Novelis, Hydro Aluminium, Becker Industrial Coatings, Akzo Nobel Industrial Finishes, BASF, Shingels, Henkel, Bronx…

Organisational structure 
The General Meeting of the Association is the ultimate authority in the Association. A delegate of each ECCA member company is appointed to participate in and vote at the General Meeting of the Association.

The Executive Committee comprises the President, the immediate Past-President, the Vice-President, the Marketing Committee, the Technical Committee, the Environment and Sustainability Committee chairs and the Managing Director of the Association.

The Board of Directors includes the members of the Executive Committee plus some other members elected by the General Meeting. In 2013, there are 16 Board members.

The Head office is responsible for the day-to-day management of the Association. 4 staff members are working on a full-time basis (in 2013).

ECCA is also nationally represented in France, Germany, the UK, Italy, the Netherlands, and Nordic Countries.

Notes

Sources 
AkzoNobel Coil Coatings Europe, https://web.archive.org/web/20130528041259/http://www.akzonobel.com/CCE/coil_coatings/ourindustry/ecca/,
ArcelorMittal, http://www.constructalia.com/francais/actualites/plus_dactus/plus_dactus100/magazine_ecca_2012_une_source_d_inspiration_pour_les_architectes,
Shingels, https://web.archive.org/web/20140714204231/http://shingels.com/?page_id=657&lang=en,
Precoat Metals, http://www.precoat.com/links.htm,
Spooner Industries, http://www.spooner.co.uk/products/36/coil-coating ,
Novacel, http://www.novacel.fr/fr/novacel/partenariat.html,
The Plan "Architecture and Technologies in details", https://web.archive.org/web/20140714212808/http://www.theplan.it/J/index.php?option=com_content&view=article&id=2366:alcoa&Itemid=1&lang=en,
Union of International Associations, http://www.uia.be/s/or/en/1100007909,
Tata Steel, http://www.tatasteel.com/,
BASF, http://www.basf.com/

External links 
 Wikipedia  European Coil Coating Association
 Wikipedia  European Coil Coating Association
ECCA website, http://www.prepaintedmetal.eu,
ECCA Online Courses "Academy", http://www.prepaintedmetalacademy.eu,
Creative Building, http://www.creativebuilding.eu,
Creative Roofing, http://www.creativeroofing.eu,

Metallurgical organizations
Paint and coatings industry